Lola Sheldon-Galloway is a Montana politician, and currently serves in the Montana House of Representatives.

Lola was born in 1959 in Great Falls, Montana. She attended Montana State University in 2010. Her husband, Steven Galloway was elected to the state House of Representatives in 2020. They both have 6 children.

References

Living people
Republican Party members of the Montana House of Representatives
21st-century American politicians
Politicians from Great Falls, Montana
Montana State University alumni
21st-century American women politicians
1959 births